Fauja Singh Sarari  also known as Fauja Singh Rana is an Indian politician and the MLA representing the Guru Har Sahai Assembly constituency in the Punjab Legislative Assembly. He is a member of the Aam Aadmi Party.  He was elected as the MLA in the 2022 Punjab Legislative Assembly election.

Member of Legislative Assembly
He represents the Guru Har Sahai Assembly constituency as MLA in Punjab Assembly. The Aam Aadmi Party gained a strong 79% majority in the sixteenth Punjab Legislative Assembly by winning 92 out of 117 seats in the 2022 Punjab Legislative Assembly election. MP Bhagwant Mann was sworn in as Chief Minister on 16 March 2022.

Committee assignments of Punjab Legislative Assembly
Member (2022–23) Committee on Public Undertakings  
Member (2022–23) Committee on Privileges

Cabinet Minister
5 MLAs including Fauja Singh Sarari were inducted into the cabinet and their swearing in ceremony took place on 4 July 2022. On 5 July, Bhagwant Mann announced the expansion of his cabinet of ministers with five new ministers to the departments of Punjab state government. Fauja Singh Sarari was among the inducted ministers and was given the charge of following departments.

Allegations
On 11 September 2022 opposition politician Sukhpal Singh Khaira levelled allegations of corruption against Minister Fauja Singh while sharing an audio call recording clip on Twitter.

Electoral performance

References

External links
 

Living people
Punjab, India MLAs 2022–2027
Aam Aadmi Party politicians from Punjab, India
Year of birth missing (living people)